Chemik Bydgoszcz may refer to:

Chemik Bydgoszcz (football), a Polish association football club
Chemik Bydgoszcz (volleyball), a Polish professional volleyball team
Chemik / Zawisza Bydgoszcz, a defunct Polish association football club created by a merger